Acker is a surname from German or Old English, meaning "field". It is related to the word "acre" and is the root of the surname Ackerman.

People with this surname include:
 Alex Acker (born 1983), American basketball player
 Amy Acker (born 1976), American actress
 Bill Acker (born 1956), American football player
 Dieter Acker (1940–2006), German composer
 Ed Acker (born 1929), American businessman
 Enrico Acker (born 1990), South African rugby player
 Ephraim Leister Acker (1827–1903), American politician
 Fredda Acker (1925–1980), American baseball player and beauty queen
 Hans Acker (c. 1380 – 1461), German stained glass artist
 Henry Acker (1804–1874 or 1875), American politician
 Jacob Acker, 15th-century German painter
 Jean Acker (1892–1978), American actress
 Jim Acker (born 1958), American baseball player
 Joan Acker (1924–2016), American feminist sociologist
 Johann Heinrich Acker (1647–1719), German writer
 John Acker (1870–1933), American politician
 Julia Acker (1898–1942), Polish artist
 Kathy Acker (1947–1997), American writer
 Lewis Acker (c.1817–1885), New Zealand whaler, boat builder, trader, and farmer
 Marjorie Acker Phillips (1894–1985), American painter
 Maurice Acker (born 1987), American basketball player
 Milo M. Acker (1853–1922), American politician from New York
 Shane Acker (born 1971, American filmmaker
 Sharon Acker (born 1935), Canadian actress
 Steadham Acker (1896–1952), American aviator
 Tom Acker (1930–2021), American baseball player
 William Acker (1927–2018), American judge from Alabama
 Wolfert Acker (1667–1753), colonial American literary subject; father of Siber, Abraham and Steven

See also 
 Van Acker, another surname
 Ackers, another surname

References 

German-language surnames